Lucy Jane Robinson (born 1966) is a British actress working mostly in television.

Her television roles include Louisa Hurst in Pride and Prejudice (1995), Robyn Duff in the fifth, sixth, seventh, eighth and ninth series of Cold Feet, 
Mayoress Christabel Wickham in the second series of The Thin Blue Line and Pam Draper in Suburban Shootout.  She has also played Frau Clovis, secretary to the Duke of Manhattan, in the Doctor Who episode "New Earth" and Mrs. Elton in the 1996 TV adaptation of Emma. She also appeared in a single episode of the ‘IT Crowd’ as a prospective employer to Jen. She had a role as Harriet Burgess in EastEnders, and appeared in a single episode of BBC TV children's series Powers. In 2006 she played the part of Louise Mallory in 'Expiation', the final episode of the first series of Lewis. She has also appeared in ITV drama William and Mary as Mrs Rick, alongside Martin Clunes and Julie Graham. She has more recently worked alongside Clunes in Doc Martin, in which she played cellist Holly.

On the big screen she played Jayne in Bridget Jones: The Edge of Reason, and Judith in The Best Exotic Marigold Hotel.  On stage, in 2014, she played the part of 'Liz', (the younger of two versions of Queen Elizabeth II) in the Moira Buffini play Handbagged.  Lucy Robinson's roles as a voice actor include Lydia Gwilt in Wilkie Collins' Armadale.

Her father was the journalist and presenter Robert Robinson. She is married to the actor Nicholas Murchie.

References

External links

1966 births
English television actresses
Living people
20th-century English actresses
21st-century English actresses
Actresses from London
English film actresses
English stage actresses
English voice actresses